Sun Jiaxu (born 1 June 1999) is a Chinese freestyle skier.

He participated at the FIS Freestyle Ski and Snowboarding World Championships 2019, winning a medal.

He competed for China at the 2022 Winter Olympics.

References

External links

1999 births
Living people
Chinese male snowboarders
Sportspeople from Xinjiang
Changji Hui Autonomous Prefecture
Freestyle skiers at the 2022 Winter Olympics
Olympic freestyle skiers of China